The Peace and War  omnibus is a collection of the three books in Joe Haldeman's The Forever War series.  The omnibus was released in 2006.

Books included in the omnibus include:
 Forever Free
 Forever Peace
 The Forever War

Trivia 

Originally removed from the 1974 novel's publication, the middle section consisting Mandella returning to Earth was re-inserted in this omnibus edition.

References 

Forever War series